The 1998 Idaho Vandals football team represented the University of Idaho in the 1998 NCAA Division I-A football season. The Vandals, led by fourth-year head coach Chris Tormey, were members of the Big West Conference and played their home games at the Kibbie Dome, an indoor facility on campus in Moscow, Idaho.

In their third season back in Division I-A, the Vandals won their only Big West title in football and were invited to the Humanitarian Bowl in Boise, in which they defeated the heavily favored Southern Mississippi Golden Eagles of Conference USA. The Vandals were led by redshirt freshman quarterback John Welsh, in his fifth start; his first was at sixth-ranked LSU in late September. The season surpassed all expectations of the team, one publication ranked Idaho last among all Division I-A teams before the start of the season. Idaho began the season with very little experience at quarterback and two new coordinators, both promoted from within. Sophomore Ed Dean was the opening day quarterback, then junior college transfer Greg Robertson started six of the next eight games. He re-injured his shoulder on Halloween, and Welsh took over for the remainder of the season.

In the rivalry game to end the regular season against Boise State, also at Bronco Stadium, Idaho made a two-point conversion in overtime to win the conference title. This was the fifteenth win over the Broncos in the last seventeen games dating back to 1982, but stands as the most recent; the Vandals then dropped a dozen straight to BSU through 2010, the last meeting in the series.
 
The Big West Conference discontinued football following the 2000 season; this remains Idaho's most recent conference title in football.

Schedule

References

External links
Gem of the Mountains: 1999 University of Idaho yearbook – 1998 football season
Idaho Argonaut – student newspaper – 1998 editions

Idaho
Idaho Vandals football seasons
Big West Conference football champion seasons
Famous Idaho Potato Bowl champion seasons
Idaho Vandals football